This is a list of fado musicians.

Singers

Guitarists
Armandinho
António Chainho
Carlos Chainho
Pedro Jóia
Artur Paredes
Carlos Paredes
Paulo Valentim
Francisco Viana

Fado
Fado
Fado